Australia Daze is a 1988 Australian documentary film that takes a look at how various Australians spent Australia Day 1988.

Overview
Australia Daze is a combination of footage shot by 29 different camera crews in various locations around Australia from midnight to midnight on 26 January 1988, the Bicentenary of European settlement in Australia.

The film includes footage of the Aboriginal Protest of the Bicentenary, where more than 40,000 people marched through Sydney in the largest march in Sydney since the Vietnam Moratorium.

Awards

References

External links

1988 films
1988 documentary films
Australian documentary films
Documentary films about Aboriginal Australians
1980s English-language films